Boneh-ye Mirza Ali Akbar (also Romanized as Boneh-ye Mīrzā ‘Alī Akbar; also known as Boneh Mīrzā ‘Alī and Boneh-ye Ḩājj Mīrzā ‘Alī) is a village in Deris Rural District, in the Central District of Kazerun County, Fars Province, Iran. At the 2006 census, its population was 446, in 96 families.

References 

Populated places in Kazerun County